Isaac Hilton (born February 26, 1981 in Long Beach, California) was an American football defensive lineman. He was drafted out of Hampton University by the New York Giants, but was cut before the beginning of the season.  He then played briefly for the Tampa Bay Buccaneers and the Carolina Panthers, and later played for the Arena Football League and Toronto Argonauts.

References

1981 births
Living people
Hampton Pirates football players
New York Giants players
Tampa Bay Buccaneers players
Carolina Panthers players
American football defensive ends
Toronto Argonauts players
Players of American football from Long Beach, California
Players of Canadian football from Long Beach, California